Orland Ugham Lindsay (born 24 March 1928) is a former Anglican clergyman. He served as the Bishop of Antigua from 1970 to 1996; and for much of that time also Archbishop of the West Indies.

Lindsay was born on 24 March 1928, and educated at McGill University. He was ordained in 1957 after World War II service with the RAF, and a brief career as a school teacher. He was curate of St Peter's Vere, Jamaica, and then priest in charge of Manchioneal Cure. From 1968, he was the principal of the Church Teachers’ College in Mandeville until his ordination to the episcopate.

Lindsay is an active Freemason in both the West Indies and the British Isles, and a Past Grand Chaplain of the United Grand Lodge of England. His wife predeceased him in November 2021.

References

1928 births
Living people
McGill University alumni
20th-century Anglican bishops in the Caribbean
Anglican bishops of Antigua
Anglican archbishops of the West Indies
20th-century Anglican archbishops
Deans of Antigua